Gorer is a surname. Notable people with the surname include:

Geoffrey Gorer (1905–1985), British anthropologist and author
Peter Alfred Gorer (1907–1961), British immunologist, pathologist, and geneticist

See also
Gore (surname), a similarly spelled surname